Love Songs is a jazz vocal album by singer-songwriter Michael Franks, released in 2004 with Warner Bros. It is Franks' twentieth album, and his fourth and compilation after Indispensable: The Best of Michael Franks in 1988, The Best of Michael Franks: A Backward Glance in 1998 and The Michael Franks Anthology: The Art of Love in 2003.

The compilation contains a selection of tracks spanning almost two decades, from The Art of Tea in 1976, to Abandoned Garden in 1995.

Track listing

References

Bibliography

Michael Franks (musician) compilation albums
2004 compilation albums
Warner Records compilation albums